Juan Diego Catholic High School (JDCHS) is a parochial school located in the Salt Lake City suburb of Draper, Utah by the Roman Catholic Diocese of Salt Lake City.

History 
American Stores's Chief Executive Officer Leonard Samuel Skaggs made an initial donation of $42 million to Roman Catholic Diocese of Salt Lake City for the purpose of providing primary and secondary education. At the time, Skaggs' donation it was the largest donation for a Catholic education campus in the United States.

A  site was selected in southern Salt Lake City and started developing for the Skaggs Catholic Center where Juan Diego Catholic resides. The property was selected due to its proximity to the St. John the Baptist Parish. All of the schools which makeup the Skaggs Catholic Center would open for the 1999–2000 school year.

Academics

Accolades 
During the 2019–20 school year, Secretary Betsy DeVos of the United States Department of Education awarded Juan Diego Catholic with the Blue Ribbon Award.

Extracurricular activities

Athletics 
Juan Diego Catholic is a Utah High School Activities Association (UHSAA) member school offering boys and girls sports complying with Title IX. Student athletes can participate in varsity, junior varsity, and freshmen only teams under the UHSAA's 3A Classification. JDCHS Athletics consisting of the following sports:

 Baseball
 Basketball (Boys/Girls)
 Cross Country (Boys/Girls)
 Football
 Golf (Boys/Girls)
 Lacrosse (Boys/Girls)
 Soccer (Boys/Girls)
 Softball
 Swim and Dive (Boys/Girls)
 Tennis (Boys/Girls)
 Track and field (Boys/Girls)
 Volleyball (Boys/Girls)
 Wrestling

Starting during the 2017–18 school year JDCHS won the Best of State Award which is a collective academic and athletic honors for 3 consecutive years.

Football

The JDCHS football team would first competed under the UHSAA in 1999 with head coach John Colosimo guided JDCHS becoming instantly successful. They have since went on to win four state championships at the 3A classification during the 2008, 2009, 2010, and 2016 seasons. In all, Colosimo's teams have won 7 Utah State Championships and has one of the winningest records in Utah.

In 2018, JDCHS and Colosimo hired the embattled coach Steve Belles of Arizona's powerhouse Hamilton High School program after a multi-year investigation into pervasive hazing. Investigators recommended child abuse charges but Attorney General Bill Montgomery never formalized the charges. At JDCHS, he would assume the position coach duties for the quarterback and defensive back.

Fine Arts 
In 2020, the JD Choir directed by John VanWagoner won 1st place in the Madrigal Small Group category at the Utah Shakespeare Festival. Anthony Tibolla, a student of Theatre Director Joe Crnich, won 1st place in the Cambridge Division Monologue category. The JD Strings Orchestra, directed by Denisse Vallecillos, won 3rd place in the Minstrel Large Group category. The 2020 High School Shakespeare Competition consisted of 83 schools, 2300 students, and 579 video entries from around the region, not just Utah.

Rivalry 
The team defeated rival Hurricane High School from 2008 to 2010 at Rice-Eccles Stadium and Delta at Cedar City in 2016.

In Popular Culture 

 Everwood (2002–2006) – Television show – Used JDCHS buildings and surroundings for filming as a substitute for the fictional Everwood, Colorado
 The Luck of the Irish (2001) – Made for television movie – Used JDCHS buildings and surroundings for filming

Campus 
JDCHS occupies a section on a multicampus grouping called the Skaggs Catholic Center with Saint John the Baptist Middle School, Saint John the Baptist Elementary School, and the Guardian Angel Day Care taking the remainder of the instructional space. The remaining land, from the initial  purchased by the Roman Catholic Diocese of Salt Lake City, also contains St. John the Baptist Parish.

Notable people

Faculty 

 Steve Belles - NFL/AFL Quarterback - Varsity Quarterback and Defensive Backs Coach
Ron James - NCAA/AFL/CFL Offensive Lineman and Coach - Varsity Head Football Coach

Alumni 
 Haylee Roderick, model
 Sofia Franklyn, podcast host

References

External links

Catholic secondary schools in Utah
Educational institutions established in 1999
Schools accredited by the Northwest Accreditation Commission
Schools in Salt Lake County, Utah
1999 establishments in Utah
Roman Catholic Diocese of Salt Lake City
Buildings and structures in Draper, Utah